is a Japanese light novel series written by Shuichi Tsukishima and illustrated by Mokyu. It began serialization online in February 2019 on the user-generated novel publishing website Shōsetsuka ni Narō. It was later acquired by Fujimi Shobo who published the series in print since October 2019 under their Fujimi Fantasia Bunko imprint. A manga adaptation with art by Shidō Yuutarō has been serialized online via Kadokawa Shoten's Young Ace Up website since February 2020. Both the light novel and manga are licensed in North America by Yen Press.

Synopsis
Even though he practices all day, Allen Rodol is on the verge of flunking out of Grand Swordcraft Academy due to his total lack of talent. To make matters worse, class prodigy Doriel, challenges him to a duel where it's win or face expulsion. However, the night before his duel, a mysterious hermit grants him a button that will give him one hundred million years to train in an alternate reality when pressed. Allen with all his doubts presses that button, after experiencing its effect he kept pushing the button many times. Now with over a billion years of straight practice under his belt, the world is about to see what the “Reject Swordsman” can really do!

Characters

Known as "Reject Swordsman", Allen is a fifteen-year-old young man and has pitch black hair and sharp brown eyes. He was constantly denied by teachers and other students. His only reason to tolerate such treatment was because of his mother  who struggled so much to provide for him and enroll him into school. Despite his calm and composed nature, Allen can lose his temper if someone badmouths his parents, which it let to his duel with Dodriel Barton. As he was training with his sword to prepare himself for the duel he encounters a mysterious and old looking person who called himself the Hermit of Time, He gives Allen a certain mysterious button which takes Allen to another world that has a Million years time for training. Allen keeps pushing the button until he trains for a 100 million years. He gains so much experience and becomes strong enough that he gets invited to "Thousand Blade Academy".

Lia is the Princess of the Vesteria Kingdom, and current host of the Primordial Dragon King, Fafnir. Her affiliated school is the High King Style. She is currently a student at the Thousand Blade Academy, where she first became classmate then roommate of Allen Rodol, after losing in a duel against him, where the loser must obey the winner. She is a beautiful and gentle fifteen-year-old girl with a more voluptuous figure, clear blue eyes, and snow white skin; she has long blonde hair tied into twin tails using wine-red colored ribbon. She appears to be feisty, hot-blooded, and quick to anger, possibly due to her sheltered upbringing, as she was shown arguing with Allen, after he accidentally walked in on her dressing and even going as far as to want him to tarnish as her slave. After the misunderstanding is solved, she gradually openly talks kindly to him. She is exceptionally feminine and straightforward to Allen and later developed strong feelings for him.

Rose is the 17th generation legitimate successor of the secret art, Sakura Blossom One-Sword Style, and bounty hunter. She is a beautiful and dignified fifteen-year-old young girl with a slender build and red eyes and silver hair mixed with pink, extending to her back. Despite being hailed as a genius, Rose doesn't show the same arrogance or cockiness as others, instead being seen as a kind and calm woman popular around her hometown. She has a strong believe in hard work whenever it comes to swordsmanship, not looking down on Allen, who uses a self-taught form. Preferring to remain calm and patient, it is rare to see Rose losing her temper in a situation. She also has a strong sense of right and wrong, doing whatever it takes to defend the innocent and do the right thing. Underneath her cool and calm exterior, she does have a burning fighting spirit and a competitive streak, which is often shown during her interactions with Allen and Lia. A notable weakness of hers is being unable to wake up in the morning, being somewhat sluggish in classes until she completely wakes up. Similar to Lia, Rose has developed strong feelings for Allen, often acting out of character when she receives praise from him.

She is the president of one of the Five Academy in the capital, the "Thousand Blade Academy". She is a cunning person who knows how take the advantage of the situation. Although being trickster, Reia is rather weak at brain work and not so good with talks. When she was still young, A large criminal organization called "Scarlet Rain", injured a swordsman who can be said to be Reia's best friend. When she heard the news, she indignantly ignored the opposition from everyone around her, and stormed the organization's headquarters alone. As a result, the Scarlet Rain, which the Holy Knights had difficulties with for many years, was destroyed in just one night. It is one of Reia's most famous acts of valour.

A servant in charge of Reia's miscellaneous matters. He is A class criminal who has been sentenced to imprisonment with hard labour for 100 years because of peeping in girls' bath several times. Though he is pervert, No.18 is an alumnus of Thousand Blade Academy and a fine swordsman.

She is the president of one of the Five Academy in the capital, the "Ice King Academy". Ferris is sly and cunning, and on top of that, she hates losing to Reia the most. 

He was originally an orphan born in a slum, and they met by chance at various occasions, and Ferris protected him since he was five years old at the time. After that, he grew up a little naughty because of giving him too much freedom, but Ferris really loved him. Shido also feels a strong debt of gratitude to Ferris, who brought him up, and calls her Miss. He has sharp ears which can even hear a low and cold tone voice. He gets angry if someone ridiculed him and he doesn't hesitate to kill them.

He is the eldest son of the House of Baron Barton. He is an arrogant spoiled child who look down on people below him. He has blue hair trailing behind his back. He used to scorned Allen Rodol as a Failed Person. After the duel with Allen, his blue hair which was severely damaged, tied behind a well-featured face. And there was a large sword scar running across his well-featured face.

Media

Light novel
The light novel series is written by Shuichi Tsukishima and illustrated by Mokyu. It began serialization online in February 2019 on the user-generated novel publishing website Shōsetsuka ni Narō. It was later acquired by Fujimi Shobo, who have published ten volumes since October 2019 under their Fujimi Fantasia Bunko imprint. The light novel is licensed in North America by Yen Press.

Manga
A manga adaptation with art by Shidō Yuutarō has been serialized online via Kadokawa Shoten's Young Ace Up website since February 2020. It has been collected in four tankōbon volumes. The manga is also licensed in North America by Yen Press.

References

External links
  at Shōsetsuka ni Narō 
  
  
 

2019 Japanese novels
Adventure anime and manga
Anime and manga based on light novels
Fantasy anime and manga
Fujimi Fantasia Bunko
Isekai anime and manga
Isekai novels and light novels
Japanese webcomics
Kadokawa Shoten manga
Kadokawa Dwango franchises
Light novels
Light novels first published online
Science fiction anime and manga
Seinen manga
Shōsetsuka ni Narō
Webcomics in print
Yen Press titles